Mirik subdivision is a subdivision of the Darjeeling district in the state of West Bengal, India. It was declared a subdivision on 30 March 2017.

Subdivisions
Darjeeling district is divided into the following administrative subdivisions:

Police stations
Police stations in the Mirik subdivision have the following features and jurisdiction:

Blocks
Community development blocks in Mirik subdivision are:

Demographics

According to the 2011 census, Hindus numbered 38,576 and formed 66.64% of the population. Buddhists numbered 12,816 and formed 22.14% of the population. Christians numbered 4,239 and formed 7.32% of the population. Muslims numbered 346 and formed 0.60% of the population. Others numbered 1,910 and formed 3.30% of the population.

Gram panchayats
Gram panchayats in Mirik subdivision are :

 Mirik block consists of rural areas with 6 gram panchayats, viz. Chenga Panighata, Paheligaon School Dara-I, Paheligaon School Dara-II, Soureni-I, Soureni-II and Duptin.

Education
Given in the table below (data in numbers) is a comprehensive picture of the education scenario in Darjeeling district, with data for the year 2012–13.

Note: Primary schools include junior basic schools; middle schools, high schools and higher secondary schools include madrasahs; technical schools include junior technical schools, junior government polytechnics, industrial technical institutes, industrial training centres, nursing training institutes etc.; technical and professional colleges include engineering colleges, medical colleges, para-medical institutes, management colleges, teachers training and nursing training colleges, law colleges, art colleges, music colleges etc. Special and non-formal education centres include sishu siksha kendras, madhyamik siksha kendras, centres of Rabindra mukta vidyalaya, recognised Sanskrit tols, institutions for the blind and other handicapped persons, Anganwadi centres, reformatory schools etc.

Educational institutions
The following institution in located in Mirik subdivision:
Mirik College was established in 2000 at Mirik.

Healthcare
The table below (all data in numbers) presents an overview of the medical facilities available and patients treated in the hospitals, health centres and sub-centres in 2013 in Darjeeling district, with data for the year 2012–13.:

.* Excluding nursing homes.

Medical facilities
Medical facilities in Mirik subdivision are as follows:

Rural Hospitals: (Name, CD block, location, beds) 
Mirik Rural Hospital, Mirik CD block, Mirik, 30 beds

Primary Health Centres : (CD block-wise)(CD block, PHC location, beds)
Mirik CD block: Sourani Bustee (10), Duptin (PO Mirik) (2), Panighatta (OPD only)

Legislative segments
As per order of the Delimitation Commission in respect of the delimitation of constituencies in West Bengal, the whole area under this subdivision, viz. Mirik block and Mirik municipality/notified area is part of the Kurseong assembly constituency of West Bengal. This constituency is an assembly segment of Darjeeling Lok Sabha constituency.

References

Subdivisions of West Bengal
Subdivisions of Darjeeling district